Macrotylus is a genus of plant bugs in the family Miridae. There are at least 60 described species in Macrotylus.

Species
These 69 species belong to the genus Macrotylus:

References

Further reading

 
 
 
 
 
 
 
 
 

Phylinae
Cimicomorpha genera